Bojan Bazelli,  (born 15 August 1957) is a Montenegrin cinematographer and director of film, commercials, and music videos. His credits include collaborations with filmmakers like Abel Ferrara, Gore Verbinski, Doug Liman, Paul Schrader, Adam Shankman, and Michael Bay.

Bazelli studied at Film and TV School of the Academy of Performing Arts in Prague. Impressed with one of Bazelli's student films, director Abel Ferrara hired Bazelli to shoot China Girl in New York City. He subsequently filmed King of New York and Body Snatchers with Ferrara as well.

Bazelli received an Independent Spirit Awards in 1990 for his work on King of New York. He was honored for Best Cinematography in both 1996 and 1998 at the American Independent Commercial Producers (AICP), one of the few cinematographers to have received this honor twice. Bazelli also received a Clio Award for Best Cinematography in 1998, and the film Kalifornia was awarded Best Cinematography at the Montreal World Film Festival.

Filmography

References

External links
 

1957 births
Living people
Montenegrin music video directors
Montenegrin cinematographers